Arpenik Charents (July 25, 1932 in Yerevan - February 12, 2008 in Yerevan) was an Armenian writer, literary critic, specialist in Charents studies. She is the daughter of the great Armenian poet Yeghishe Charents.

Biography 
After her parents' arrest in 1937 during the stalinist terror, she lived in The Kanaker Children's home. 
She studied philology at Yerevan State University. Arpenik was one of the main initiators and founders of the Yeghishe Charents House-Museum in Yerevan (also the chairwoman of the scientific council), recollected her father's 6000-volume library, researched and spread the literary work and  life story of Yeghishe Charents all over the country. She wrote novels, short stories and memoirs about her sad childhood, and was a member of the Writers Union of Armenia.

Books 
 The Unknown Inside the Known, Yerevan, 2005
 My Universities, Yerevan, 2000
 The Prayers of Yeghishe Charents, Yerevan, 1999
 The Children's Home, Yerevan, 1994

External links
Biography, Writers' Union of Armenia Official Site
Arpenik Ch., Unknown in the Known: Short Stories
The last summer of Yeghishe Charents, by Arpenik Charents 
"Aniv" journal about Arpenik

1932 births
2008 deaths
Writers from Yerevan
20th-century Armenian women writers
21st-century Armenian women writers
20th-century Armenian writers
21st-century Armenian writers